Kotagiri Sridhar is an Indian politician. He was elected to the Lok Sabha, the lower house of the Parliament of India from Eluru, Andhra Pradesh in the 2019 Indian general election as a member of the YSR Congress Party.

References

External links
 Official biographical sketch in Parliament of India website

India MPs 2019–present
Lok Sabha members from Andhra Pradesh
Living people
YSR Congress Party politicians
1973 births
People from Eluru